Rob Evans (born 5 June 1995) is a Welsh semi-professional footballer who plays for AFC Telford United in the National League North.

Career

Wrexham
Evans was born in Penycae, Wrexham County Borough. He made his first-team debut for Wrexham in a Conference Premier match against Newport County in April 2012. Evans became Wrexham's youngest ever captain whilst leading Wrexham to a 2–1 FA Trophy victory over Gresley in 2013 at the age of 18. He scored his first competitive goal for Wrexham against Barnet in September 2014. Following an impressive and ever present 2015–16 season, Evans won the young player of the year award for the second successive year.

Evans was released by Wrexham at the end of 2016–17.

Billericay Town
On 28 May 2017, Evans signed for Isthmian League Premier Division club Billericay Town. He made 36 games and scored 1, before he left Billericay.

Warrington Town
After two months without a club, Rob signed for Northern Premier League side Warrington Town, along former Wrexham teammate David Raven. Despite the Welshman being offered a new deal to remain at Cantilever Park, he announced in May on Twitter that his time at the club had come to an end.

Curzon Ashton
Robbie signed for Conference North side Curzon Ashton in May 2019.

Alfreton Town
In June 2021, Evans joined Alfreton Town after two seasons with Curzon Ashton.

AFC Telford United
On 10 March 2022, Evans joined National League North side AFC Telford United on a deal until the end of the 2021–22 season.

Career statistics

Coaching career 
On 26 July 2018 Wrexham A.F.C. announced the signing of Evans, as Coach at Glyndwr Wrexham Football Academy.

References

External links
Rob Evans profile at the Billericay Town F.C. website

1995 births
Living people
Footballers from Wrexham
Welsh footballers
Association football midfielders
Wrexham A.F.C. players
Billericay Town F.C. players
Warrington Town F.C. players
Curzon Ashton F.C. players
Alfreton Town F.C. players
AFC Telford United players
National League (English football) players